Chelsea Chandler (born January 29, 1994) is an American mixed martial artist and competes in Bantamweight division of the Ultimate Fighting Championship (UFC). A professional since 2018, she has also previously competed for Invicta Fighting Championships (Invicta FC). As of February 27, 2023, she is ranked #15 in the UFC women's bantamweight rankings.

Background 
Chandler played basketball and competed in track in high school. She started training at Tiger Muay Thai, Thailand in 2011 and  joined Nick Diaz's Academy after she finished college.

Mixed martial arts career

Invicta Fighting Championships
Martin made her promotional debut on March 24, 2018 at  Invicta FC 28: Mizuki vs. Jandiroba against Kerri Kenneson. She lost the fight via unanimous decision.

On the next fight, she faced Mitzi Merry on November 16, 2018 at  Invicta FC 32: Spencer vs. Sorenson. She won the fight via unanimous decision.

Her third fight in Invicta came on June 7, 2019 at Invicta FC 35: Bennett vs. Rodriguez facing Brittney Victoria Grizzelle. She won the fight via technical knockout in round two.

Chandler faced Olivia Parker on July 2, 2020 at Invicta FC 40: Ducote vs. Lima. She won the fight via rear naked choke submission in round one.

Chandler faced Courtney King on May 11, 2022 at Invicta FC 47. She won the bout via unanimous decision.

Ultimate Fighting Championship 

Chandler was scheduled to face Leah Letson in her UFC debut on October 1, 2022 at UFC Fight Night 211. However, Letson pulled out in late August due to personal reasons and was replaced by Julija Stoliarenko, therefore changing the pairing to a catchweight of 140 pounds. She won the bout via TKO stoppage at the end of the first round. This win earned her the Performance of the Night award.

Chandler is scheduled to face Danyelle Wolf on April 29, 2023 at UFC Fight Night 223.

Championships and accomplishments
Ultimate Fighting Championship
Performance of the Night (One time)

Mixed martial arts record

|Win
|align=center|5–1
|Julija Stoliarenko
|TKO (punches)
|UFC Fight Night: Dern vs. Yan
|
|align=center|1
|align=center|4:15
|Las Vegas, Nevada, United States
|
|-
|Win
|align=center| 4–1
|Courtney King
| Decision (unanimous)
|Invicta FC 47: Ducote vs. Zappitella
|
|align=center| 3 
|align=center| 5:00
|Kansas City, Kansas, United States
|
|-
| Win
| align=center| 3–1
| Olivia Parker
| Submission (rear-naked choke)
| Invicta FC 40: Ducote vs. Lima
| 
| align=center| 1
| align=center| 1:05
| Kansas City, Missouri, United States
|
|-
| Win
| align=center| 2–1
| Brittney Victoria 
| TKO (punches)
| Invicta FC 35: Bennett vs. Rodriguez
| 
| align=center| 2
| align=center| 3:58
| Kansas City, Missouri, United States
| 
|-
| Win
| align=center| 1–1
| Mitzi Merry
| Decision (unanimous)
| Invicta FC 32: Spencer vs. Sorenson
| 
| align=center| 3
| align=center| 5:00
| Kansas City, Missouri, United States
|
|-
| Loss
| align=center| 0–1
| Kerri Kenneson
| Decision (unanimous)
| Invicta FC 28: Mizuki vs. Jandiroba
| 
| align=center| 3
| align=center| 5:00
| Kansas City, Missouri, United States
| 
|-

See also
 List of current UFC fighters
 List of female mixed martial artists

References

External links
 
 Chelsea Chandler at Invicta FC

1994 births
Living people
American female mixed martial artists
American practitioners of Brazilian jiu-jitsu
Female Brazilian jiu-jitsu practitioners
Bantamweight mixed martial artists
Mixed martial artists from California
Mixed martial artists utilizing Brazilian jiu-jitsu
Sportspeople from Stockton, California
21st-century American women